George Miles Hobart-Hampden, 10th Earl of Buckinghamshire (born 15 December 1944) is a British peer and businessman.

He sat as a Conservative in the House of Lords from 1984 until the House of Lords Act 1999 came into force. 

The son of Cyril Langel Hobart-Hampden and his wife Margaret Jolliffe, he was educated at Clifton College and Exeter University, where he graduated BA in 1967, and then at Birkbeck College, London, and the Institute of Commonwealth Studies, where he took a MA in 1968. From 1970 to 1981 he was with Noble Lowndes and partners and between 1981 and 1991 was a director of various companies within the Hong Kong Banking Group. In 1995 he was a partner in Watson Wyatt Worldwide.

On 19 April 1983 Hobart-Hampden inherited from a cousin the peerages of Earl of Buckinghamshire (1746) and Baron Hobart of Blickling (1728) and the Hobart baronetcy (1611). 

On 27 July 1968 he married firstly Susan Jennifer Adams, a daughter of Raymond W. Adams. They divorced in 1975, and he married secondly Alison Wightman Forrest, daughter of William Forrest.

Honours
Fellow of the Institute of Directors, 1983

Notes

1944 births
Earls in the Peerage of Great Britain
Living people